Mateusz Bąk (born 26 February 1983 in Pruszcz Gdański) is a retired Polish footballer who played as a goalkeeper for Lechia Gdańsk for the majority of his career. Over the course of his career Bąk was involved in 6 promotion winning seasons while playing for; Lechia Gdańsk (5) and Wisła Płock (1).

Football

Lechia Gdańsk
A trainee of Jantar Pruszcz Gdański and Lechia Gdańsk, Bąk joined the Lechia first team in 2001. In 1998 Lechia Gdańsk formed a merger with Polonia Gdańsk to create Lechia-Polonia Gdańsk. After 3 unsuccessful years Lechia wished to play football again independently which resulted in them having to re-start in the regional divisions of the sixth tier. For an 18 year old Bąk this offered him the chance for consistent playing time with the football team he grew up supporting. In his first season Bąk played 22 times for Lechia, including scoring the final goal in the 15-0 win over LKS Waplewo from the penalty spot in stoppage time. In his first four seasons Lechia achieved four promotions winning each of the leagues along the way. By this point Lechia had reached the II liga, the second tier in Polish football at the time. After finishes of 10th and 5th the following two seasons, Lechia achieved promotion by winning the league in 2008. In his first season in the Ekstraklasa Bąk played a total of 12 league games, making 7 appearances in the first half of the following season as the second choice goalkeeper. To supporters Bąk become the symbol of a "new" Lechia Gdańsk due to him being the only player to stay with the team from the sixth tier right up to the Ekstraklasa, the first tier.

Portugal, Poland and Bulgaria
After losing his place in the first team Bąk moved to Portuguese side Marítimo on loan for the second half of the season, with the view of it becoming a permanent deal. After failing to make any appearances during the loan spell Marítimo decided against the permanent transfer. He returned to Lechia where he briefly played for the second team, Lechia Gdańsk II. Bąk moved to Wisła Płock over the winter transfer window, and made 5 appearances for Wisła in 2011 helping the team to win promotion from the II liga. In July 2011 he joined Podbeskidzie Bielsko-Biała on a two-year contract moving back to the Ekstraklasa. This was Podbeskidzie's first ever season in the Ekstraklasa, with Bąk making 12 appearances to help the team avoid relegation. The following season he only made 3 appearances in the opening half of the season, and joined Bulgarian top division club Etar 1924 in early 2013. For Etar he only made 3 appearances, of which included a 6-1 defeat and another game including a sending off for himself. His time at Etar was part of a tumultuous time for the club, including 20 players signed during the January transfer window (Bąk included), death threats to players from the club's president, the club taking 80% of players wages, the club no longer paying for hotels for players to stay in, including food, and the club providing no training sessions after the club's head coach left. While Bąk and three other Polish players were only on 4 month contracts, the Polish Football Association helped them to get out of their contracts early due to the terrible conditions provided by the club.

Return to Lechia Gdańsk
After the unsuccessful spell in Bulgaria Bąk left Etar only 6 months after joining returning to Poland to play with Lechia in July 2013. His return to Lechia saw him once again playing regular football, something he hadn't experienced since his first spell at the club. In the first two seasons of his return he made 27 and 21 appearances for Lechia in the league. With younger goalkeepers being transferred to the team Bąk found himself playing a bigger role in the development of these other goalkeepers. For the 2015-16 season Bąk was totally kept out of the first team, instead having to settle for Lechia Gdańsk II team, playing 20 times for the second team that season. With opportunities in the first team now limited for Bąk he announced his plans for retirement in 2016 aged 33. In the last home game of the season against Pogoń Szczecin, Lechia celebrated the careers of Piotr Wiśniewski and Mateusz Bąk. Both players had played over 10 years for Lechia, while Lechia was the only professional club Wiśniewski played for. Both players came on as substitutes in the 4–0 win over Pogon, with Wiśniewski scoring the final goal of the game, while Bąk made an important save to keep a clean sheet for the team. After his retirement it was announced that Bąk would be staying with Lechia Gdańsk, being given the role as a goalkeeping coach for the academy, before becoming Lechia Gdańsk II's goalkeeping coach at the start of the 2018-19 season.

Honours

Lechia Gdańsk
II liga (second tier)
Winners (1): 2007-08
III liga (group II) (third tier)
Winners (1): 2004-05
IV liga (pomeranian group) (fourth tier)
Winners (1): 2003-04
Liga okręgowa (group Gdańsk II) (fifth tier)
Winners (1): 2002-03
Klasa A (group Gdańsk IV) (sixth tier)
Winners (1): 2001-02

Wisła Płock
II liga (eastern group) (third tier)
Runners-up (1): 2010-11

Career statistics

Club

References

External links
 
 Lechia Gdansk Player Profile 

1983 births
Living people
People from Pruszcz Gdański
Polish footballers
Association football goalkeepers
Lechia Gdańsk players
Lechia Gdańsk II players
C.S. Marítimo players
Wisła Płock players
Podbeskidzie Bielsko-Biała players
FC Etar 1924 Veliko Tarnovo players
First Professional Football League (Bulgaria) players
Polish expatriate footballers
Expatriate footballers in Portugal
Expatriate footballers in Bulgaria
Sportspeople from Pomeranian Voivodeship